Alston Scott Householder (5 May 1904 – 4 July 1993) was an American mathematician who specialized in mathematical biology and numerical analysis.

He is the inventor of the Householder transformation and of Householder's method.

Career 
Householder was born in Rockford, Illinois, USA. He received a BA in philosophy from the Northwestern University of Evanston, Illinois in 1925, and an MA, also in philosophy, from Cornell University in 1927. He taught mathematics while preparing for his PhD, which was awarded at the University of Chicago in 1937.  His thesis dealt with the topic of the calculus of variations.

After receiving his doctorate, Householder concentrated on the field of mathematical biology, working with several other researchers with Nicolas Rashevsky at the University of Chicago.

In 1946, Householder joined the Mathematics Division of the Oak Ridge National Laboratory, where he was appointed chair in 1948; it is during this period that his interests shift toward numerical analysis. In 1969 he left ORNL to become Professor of Mathematics at the University of Tennessee, where he eventually became chairman. In 1974 he retired and went to live in  Malibu, California.

Householder contributed in different ways to the organisation of research. He was president of the Society for Industrial and Applied Mathematics (SIAM) and of the Association for Computing Machinery (ACM). He was a member of the redactional committees for Psychometrika, Numerische Mathematik, Linear Algebra and Its Applications, and was editor in chief of the SIAM Journal on Numerical Analysis. He opened up his wide personal bibliography on numerical linear algebra in form of a KWIC index. He also organized the important Gatlinburg Conferences, which are still held under the name Householder Symposia.

Personal life 
Householder spent his youth in Alabama. He was first married to Belle Householder (died 1975, children: John and Jackie) and remarried 1984 to Heidi Householder (née Vogg). He died in  Malibu, California, USA in 1993.

Selected works
 Discussion of a set of points in terms of their mutual distances, 1938: pioneer paper in multidimensional scaling (See also, M.W. Richardson)
 The theory of matrices in numerical analysis, 1964

References

External links

Biography by  G. W. Stewart

1904 births
1993 deaths
20th-century American mathematicians
Cornell University alumni
Theoretical biologists
Northwestern University alumni
Numerical analysts
Linear algebraists
Oak Ridge National Laboratory people
People from Rockford, Illinois
Presidents of the Association for Computing Machinery
University of Chicago alumni
Presidents of the Society for Industrial and Applied Mathematics
Mathematicians from Illinois